The sai (Japanese: 釵, ; Chinese: 鐵尺) is a traditional Okinawan stabbing weapon used for stabbing and striking. It is primarily used in ninjutsu and kobudo, as well as in southern Chinese martial arts. The basic form of the weapon is that of a sharp metal prong with two sharp and curved side prongs (yoku) projecting from the handle (tsuka). There are many different types of sai with varying prongs for trapping and blocking.

History
Before its creation in Okinawa, similar weapons were already being used in other Asian countries including India, Thailand, China, Vietnam, Malaysia, and Indonesia. The basic concept of the sai may have been brought to Okinawa from one or several of these places simultaneously. Based on the Indian trisula, early evidence in the form of Japanese art shows that the chabang may predate the sai in China. The word trisula itself can refer to either a long or short-handled trident. Because the trisula was created in India, it is possible that the concept of the sai originated in India and spread along with Hinduism and Buddhism. This is supported by the fact that the trisula is important as a Hindu-Buddhist symbol.

In Okinawa the sai was used by domestic police (ufuchiku) to arrest criminals and for crowd control. Use of the sai in Japanese martial arts was improved in 1668 by Moto Chohei, an Okinawan prince.

The sai eventually reached Japan in the form of the jitte, which usually has only a single prong although some jitte have two prongs like a sai. Both are stabbing weapons, used to stab or strike.

Parts of the sai

 Monouchi, the main prong of the sai, this can be round or faceted.
 Yoku, the prong like side guards which are usually symmetrical but the manji design developed by Taira Shinken employs oppositely-facing yoku resembling the swastika (manji) from which it takes its name.
 Tsume, the sharp tip of the side prong (yoku).
 Moto, the actual center point between the two side guards.
 Tsuka, the handle of the sai. The tsuka can be wrapped with different materials such as cord or ray skin (same) to provide a grip.
 Tsukagashira, the butt end of the handle (tsuka).
 Saki, the sharp tip or point of the sai.

Technique

The sai is typically used in pairs, with one in each hand. Five kata are commonly taught, including two kihon kata. The utility of the sai as a weapon is reflected in its distinctive shape. It is a weapon used for fast stabs and strikes but it also has many defensive techniques. The style includes a variety of blocks, parries and captures against attackers from all directions and height levels. Use of the point, knuckle and main prong is emphasized, as well as rapid grip changes for multiple stabs and strikes.

There are several different ways of wielding the sai, which give it the versatility to be used both lethally and non-lethally. One way to hold it is by gripping the handle with all of the fingers and pinching the thumb against the joint between the handle and the main prong. This allows one to manipulate the sai so that it can be pressed against the forearm and also help avoid getting the thumb caught in the handle when blocking an attack. The change is made by putting pressure on the thumbs and rotating the sai around until it is facing backwards and the index finger is aligned with the handle.

The knuckle end is good for concentrating the force of a punch, while the long prong can serve as a protection for a blow to the forearm. In practice, some prefer to keep the index finger extended in alignment with the main prong regardless of whether the knuckle end or the main prong is exposed. The finger may be straight or slightly curled. Used in this way, the other fingers are kept on the main prong, with the thumb supporting the handle.

One technique commonly depicted is the use of one of a sai's hooks to entrap and lock an attacker's blade. Some variations of sai have their hooks pointing inwards towards the main prong to facilitate this maneuver. While this does not completely immobilize the attacker, it encumbers them in close quarters, especially if the defender can use twisting techniques to disarm the attacker.

The grips described above leverage the versatility of this implement as both an offensive and a defensive weapon. Both grips facilitate flipping between the point and the knuckle being exposed while the sai is held in strong grip positions.

Because there is no morphological plural in Japanese, the word "sai" refers to either a single weapon or multiple. Nicho sai refers to a kata that uses two sai, while sancho sai kata refers to kata using three sai.

Popular culture
 Teenage Mutant Ninja Turtles features two sai as the primary weapon of Raphael. Sai were also used by many versions of the Foot Clan and by Kojima, a boar assassin from Miyamoto Usagi's world in the 2003 version.
 Marvel Comics features sai used by Elektra.

See also
 Jitte
 Mileena
 Nunti Bo
 Okinawan kobudō
 Parrying dagger
 Tekpi
 Trident
 Trishula

References

Further reading 
 Fumio Demura, Sai: Karate Weapon of Self-Defense

External links

 How to Use Sai Intructional Video
 Mr. Yoong Swee Yin - Double Sai - Shuang Chai 雙 釵

Weapons of Okinawa
Weapons of Japan
Melee weapons
Non-lethal weapons